Barnhill may refer to:

People
 Barnhill (surname)

Places
 Barnhill, Cheshire, in Broxton, England
 Barnhill, County Fermanagh, a townland in County Fermanagh, Northern Ireland
 Barnhill, Dundee, Scotland
 Barnhill, Illinois, United States
 Barnhill, Jura, Scotland, a farmhouse on Jura, Scotland, used by George Orwell
 Barnhill, Ohio, United States
 Barnhill, Perth and Kinross, Scotland, an eastern suburb of Perth
 Barnhill railway station, in Glasgow, Scotland
 Barnhill, Wembley, a ward in Brent North

See also
Barnhill Community High School